Vallecas  was a municipality of Spain that disappeared as such in 1950, when its annexation to the Municipality of Madrid was effectuated. Nowadays it is a large neighborhood of Madrid composed of two districts: Puente de Vallecas (population 240,917) and Villa de Vallecas (population 65,162).

Overview
Vallecas is known for its working-class inhabitants who have given it the local names Vallekas or Valle del Kas. Many initiatives that take place in the district show this countercultural attitude by replacing the letter c with k, examples of this are the local radio station Radio Vallekas, the local television channel Tele K, the music festival Vallekas Rock, etc.

The local pride coalesces around the Rayo Vallecano football team.

During the 1960s, many Spanish immigrants to the Madrid conurbation settled in Vallecas, forming the largest slum area around Madrid.

During the decades of the Francoist State, Vallecas earned its reputation as a neighbourhood of resistance against the Francoist State.

In this tradition, Vallecas is also home to the Spanish ska band Ska-P, noted for its anarchist and leftist lyrics.

In recent years, the district of Vallecas Villa has experienced significant growth with about 25,000 new flats and houses called "PAU de Vallecas" or "Ensanche de Vallecas", one of the biggest new areas in Madrid.
Professional footballer Álvaro Negredo is Vallecas' most famous export. Nicknamed The Beast of Vallecas, Negredo currently plays for Cádiz CF. The famous lightweight boxer Poli Díaz, nicknamed The Colt of Vallecas, also comes from this renowned working-class neighbourhood. Atlético Madrid and Spain national team midfielder Koke was also born in Vallecas.

See also
Rayo Vallecano
Puente de Vallecas
Villa de Vallecas

References

External links

Vallecas Todo Cultura 
paudevallecas.org (website of a neighborhood-organisation in the new housing area in the district of Vallecas Villa, with web-forum, in Spanish)

Neighbourhoods of Madrid
Former municipalities in Spain